Apke is a surname. Notable people with the surname include:

Steve Apke (born 1965), American football player
Tom Apke (born 1943), American basketball coach
Troy Apke (born 1995), American football player

See also
Åke